World Marathon Challenge is a multievent marathon competition that involves completing seven full  run marathon races on seven continents in seven days.

History
The first World Marathon Challenge was held in 2015, beginning in Antarctica on January 17, 2015, and ending in Sydney. The inaugural event combined the race results from Antarctica, Chile, the United States, Spain, Morocco, United Arab Emirates and Australia. David Gething won the inaugural event with a total time for all seven races combined of 25 hours, 36 minutes and 3 seconds, and an average time of 3:39:26 per race, against a field that included eleven other runners, ten of whom were male. Marianna Zaikova of Finland became the first woman to complete the event as the only successful woman in the 2015 field.

The 2016 event began on January 26, 2016, with certified marathon courses in Union Glacier (Antarctica), Punta Arenas (Chile), Miami (USA), Madrid (Spain), Marrakech (Morocco), Dubai (United Arab Emirates) and Sydney (Australia). Registration for the event was €32,000. In 2016 Becca Pizzi became the first American woman to complete the event, while finishing first among the women runners, with a total time of 27:26:15 hours and an average time of 3:55:11 hours. United States Marine Corps captain Daniel Cartica won the race with a total time of 24:46:56 and an average time of 3:32:25, besting a field of thirteen other runners and setting a new world record for the event.

In 2017, American Michael Wardian won in 19:21:36 (averaging 2:45:57 per marathon), which was a new world record, and in the women's race Chilean Silvana Camelio won in 29:28:17. In 2018, the men's race was won by Irish Gary Thornton in 22:26:16 and the women's race by American Becca Pizzi (who also won in 2016) in 28:32:35.

In 2019, the marathon courses were in Nova (Antarctica), Cape Town (South Africa), Perth (Australia), Dubai (United Arab Emirates), Madrid (Spain), Santiago (Chile) and Miami (USA). The men's edition was won by American Michael Wardian in 20:49:30 and the women's edition was won by British Susannah Gill in 24:17:6 (initially reported as 24:19:09). With an average of 3:28:9 per marathon, Gill's time was a new world record for women, which was surpassed the following year by Danish Kristina Schou Madsen with 3:25:57 per marathon (total time 24:1:40). The 2020 race was also unusual for other reasons; since it happened during the COVID-19 pandemic, seven of the people who had planned on participating were unable to do so, and because of extreme weather preventing the plane from flying to Antarctic for the first day's run, Cape Town instead became day one with Antarctica on day two.

Notes

External links
Official website

Annual athletics series
Long-distance races
Marathon running
Recurring sporting events established in 2015